William Wiard (3 December 1927 - 3 July 1987) was an American film and television director. He directed over 150 episodes of television, several TV films, and the theatrical film Tom Horn.

Life and work
William Orphie Wiard was born in Los Angeles and began his film career in 1955 as a sound editor for Dragnet. In the mid-1960s he moved on to directing.

Wiard was best known as a director of television westerns and detective shows, such as Mister Roberts, Get Smart, Daniel Boone, The High Chaparral, Room 222, Bonanza, M*A*S*H, The F.B.I., Barnaby Jones, Cannon, The Streets of San Francisco, The Rockford Files, Bret Maverick, Scarecrow and Mrs. King, and Spenser: For Hire.

From 1976 to 1986 he directed several television films in the horror and thriller genres, including Scott Free (1976) with Michael Brandon, When Walls Kill (1981) with Parker Stevenson, Help Wanted: Male (1982) with Suzanne Pleshette and Gil Gerard, High School Killer (1983) with Diane Franklin, and Kicks (1985) with Anthony Geary and Shelley Hack.

Though he worked mainly in television, Wiard also directed the theatrical film Tom Horn, starring Steve McQueen in one of his last roles.

Wiard was married to Georgiana Sherman and had three children. He died in Los Angeles of cancer at the age of 59.

Selected filmography

Film
 1980: Tom Horn

TV films
 1976: Scott Free
 1978: Ski Lift to Death 
 1980: The Girl, the Gold Watch & Everything
 1981: This House Possessed
 1981: The Seal 
 1982: Help Wanted: Male
 1982: Fantasies
 1983: Deadly Lessons
 1985: Kicks

References

External links

 Filmography of William Wiard in The New York Times

1927 births
1987 deaths
American film directors
American television directors